Soong Ai-ling, legally Soong E-ling or Eling Soong (July 15, 1889 – October 18, 1973) was a Chinese businesswoman, the eldest of the Soong sisters and the wife of H. H. Kung (Kung Hsiang-Hsi), who was the richest man in the early 20th century Republic of China. The first character of her given name is written as 靄 (same pronunciation) in some texts. Her Christian name was Nancy.

Life
Born in Shanghai, she attended McTyeire School beginning at age 5.  Soong Ai-ling arrived in the United States at the Port of San Francisco, California on June 30, 1904, aboard the SS Korea at the age of 14 to begin her education at Wesleyan College in Macon, Georgia. She returned to China in 1909 after her graduation. In late 1911, she worked as a secretary for Sun Yat-sen, a job later taken by her sister, Soong Ching-ling, who later became Madame Sun Yat-sen.

Soong Ai-ling met her future husband, Kung Hsiang Hsi, in 1913, and they married the following year in Yokohama. After marrying, Soong taught English for a while and engaged in child welfare work.

In 1936, she founded the Sandai Company (also called Sanbu Company) and became a successful and immensely rich businesswoman in her own right. During the Second Sino-Japanese War, she was active in the Committee of the National Friends of the Wounded Soldiers and the National Refugee Children's Association, and chair of the local Hong Kong section of the Committee of the National Friends of the Wounded Soldiers.

The three Soong sisters made public appearances in Hong Kong in favor of relief work until 1940, when the Japanese radio stated that they would evacuate rather than join the Chinese government in Chongqing to endure the war conditions.  In response to this, they left for Chongqing, where they continued to appear to boost public morale touring hospitals, air-raid shelter systems and bomb sites during the war. They founded the Indusco (also called Gungho) organization to protect Chinese industry during wartime conditions, an organization in which Soong Ai-ling was most active of the sisters.

During the later years of the war, Soong Ai-ling, her husband, and her children were accused of graft, corruption, black-marketing and war profiteering.  In 1944, her husband was finally asked to step down as minister of finance.  She and her husband transferred their immense wealth and business abroad and left for the US.

She died at age 84 on October 18, 1973 at New York-Presbyterian Hospital in New York City. She is interred in a mausoleum at Ferncliff Cemetery in Westchester County, New York.

Children
Source:
 Kung Ling-i (daughter) 孔令儀
 Kung Ling-kan (son) 孔令侃
 Kung Ling-chun, also known as Kung Ling-wei (daughter) 孔令俊
 Kung Ling-chie (son) 孔令傑, also known as Louis C. Kung, was later an American oil executive. He married actress Debra Paget in 1964; they divorced in 1980. The couple had one son, Gregory Teh-chi Kung (born 1964) 孔德基. Louis C. Kung died in 1996 in Houston, Texas.

Media portrayal
In the 1997 Hong Kong movie The Soong Sisters, Soong Ai-ling was portrayed by actress Michelle Yeoh.

See also

 History of the Republic of China
 Soong Ching-ling
 Soong Mei-ling

References

Further reading
 Seagrave, Sterling. The Soong Dynasty. Corgi Books, 1996. .

External links 
 

1880s births
1973 deaths
Chinese Methodists
Educators from Shanghai
Sun Yat-sen family
Wesleyan College alumni
20th-century Chinese businesswomen
Chinese emigrants to the United States